Perfect Proposal (lit. Secret Temptation) is a 2015 South Korean romantic thriller film written and directed by Yoon Jae-gu, based on the novel La Femme de paille ("Woman of Straw") by Catherine Arley.

Plot

Yoo Ji-yeon is a Korean university graduate who is stuck working as a waiter under the name "Jenny Yoo" in a Macanese bar after her colleague stole her credit card and all of her money before running away, forcing her to pay her increasingly rising debt. Her Macanese friend offers her a job interview with Kim Sung-yeol, the illegitimate son of Kim Seok-gu, a successful gambling corporation chairman who owns half of the casinos in Macau. Sung-yeol asks Ji-yeon to become Seok-gu's new bride, so she can inherit his property and divide it for the two of them. Sung-yeol is unable to inherit his property due to his status. Seok-gu has become grumpy since his family's deaths years ago.

Ji-yeon reluctantly learns manners resembling Seok-gu's late wife to better her chance in attracting the old man. Arriving at his yacht, Ji-yeon becomes a part of Seok-gu's attendants that include the Korean ship captain and maid Ji Yoo-mi who takes care of Seok-gu's pet chihuahua, the Russian Viktor, and the Pakistani Khan. Having to endure Seok-gu's constant lashing, criticism, and various other rhetoric, Ji-yeon nevertheless is able to stand up and change him into a less irascible person, even managing to make him play the piano again, an activity that used to be his hobby until his family's demise. Seok-gu in turn reveals about his past as a "circus" player in Macau, his reasons for using the whistle and constantly shouting, and also mentions a woman who helped him achieve his success.

Ji-yeon though is dispirited one night and searches solace in Sung-yeol, with whom she has fallen in love. Khan, however, sneaks on their conversations and begins to keep a watchful eye on the two. The other night, Ji-yeon has had enough and tries to leave, all while stating her discomfort of having to live for 10 years with Seok-gu even if the plan did work, in front of Sung-yeol. To her surprise, Seok-gu proposes to her the next day and has apparently modified his will to include her name. He states to Sung-yeol before the reception that he ignored him as he possesses "90% work, but not 10% luck" and thus not fit to inherit the casinos. At the wedding reception, Seok-gu nicknames Ji-yeon "Cinderella".

However, Ji-yeon discovers to her horror that Seok-gu has died the night after the reception. Sung-yeol tells her that they have to act normal until their arrival to Busan, followed by delivering Seok-gu's body to his home until Sung-yeol can sign his father's modified will that includes Ji-yeon's inheritance. Ji-yeon tries hard to keep the act in front of Seok-gu's personal assistant, Jang Hye-jin, who is beginning to suspect something. Eventually, she is caught by the police and accused as the murderer. She learns that Sung-yeol has prepared to inherit 10% of the estate since five years ago, with 90% of them donated for charity due to the South Korean inheritance law; Sung-yeol has been using her since the beginning so he could not only inherit the business but also to avenge his mother's abandonment by Seok-gu. Escorted to the prison, Ji-yeon sees Khan unsuccessfully trying to reach her and shouting "Camera!".

While scanning the identification papers, Ji-yeon realizes that the woman mentioned by Seok-gu is Hye-jin. Using Seok-gu's wording, Hye-jin frees Ji-yeon into probation so she can attend Seok-gu's funeral. There, Ji-yeon attempts to reach Khan, only to be apprehended, and from the crime scene photos further realizes that Seok-gu's chihuahua has been fitted with a camera that also recorded Seok-gu's real murderer: Sung-yeol. Khan is the only one knowing this, but Sung-yeol kills him to silence him. The chihuahua is currently carried by Yoo-mi, who is hunted by Sung-yeol. Ji-yeon manages to reach their rendezvous place and after a struggle, is able to get the camera and knocks down Sung-yeol with Yoo-mi's help.

Sung-yeol is arrested for the murders while Ji-yeon's inheritance as Seok-gu's wife is realized, making her the new owner of the Macanese casinos. Ji-yeon visits Sung-yeol at the prison to hear his reasons and that he never loved her. Just before she leaves, Sung-yeol tells her that he is the one who made her "Cinderella": Ji-yeon gives a smile.

Cast
Im Soo-jung as Ji-yeon 
Yoo Yeon-seok as Sung-yeol
Lee Geung-young as Chairman Kim Seok-goo
Park Chul-min as Yacht captain Sun-jang
Jin Kyung as Jang Hye-jin
Min Do-hee as Yoo-mi
Enes Kaya as Victor
 Mahbub Alam as Khan
Lee Jong-woo as Chang-gi
Shin Yong-hoon as Detective Oh
Cho Yoon-woo as Jin-sub 
Im Dae-il as Lawyer Oh
Sung Min-soo as Lawyer Lee Jang-yeol
Sodany Soy as Interview Applicant
Dean Dawson as Landlord
Jeff Johnson as Sailor

Box office
Perfect Proposal was released on 4 June 2015 and it opened at fourth place in the box office, earning  from 95,700 admissions in its first four days. So far, it has grossed  from 145,244 admissions.

References

External links
 

2015 films
2010s romantic thriller films
CJ Entertainment films
Films shot in Macau
South Korean romantic thriller films
2010s South Korean films